50 Years of Hits is a country album by George Jones who was signed to Starday Records in 1953, released his first singles in 1954, and had his first hit with "Why Baby Why'" in 1955.

Background
Jones began recording in 1954 and his first releases were on the independent Starday label.  As his career progressed, he moved to Mercury, United Artists, Musicor, Epic (where he remained for 19 years), MCA Nashville, Asylum, and Bullet Records.  Billboard states that Jones has had more charted singles than any artist in any format of music, and 50 Years of Hits features one song per year, representing the actual year that song was released. Most of the time, the song chosen was Jones' biggest hit of that year, but sometimes it was chosen because Jones thought it was his best song that year.  The set is not historically accurate; the compilers were unable to work out a deal with Musicor to feature Jones's late-'60s hits, so they were forced to substitute re-recordings of "Walk Through This World With Me," "She's Mine," "I'll Share My World With You," and "A Good Year for the Roses" for the originals.  In addition, the inclusion of his number one single "Still Doin' Time" among his mid-1960s hits is an error; the song topped the charts in 1981.  Finally, the inclusion of a 1979 duet he recorded with Waylon Jennings, "Night Life", appears out of place as it wasn't even a single.  Nevertheless, the package is an enormous document of country music history in its own right, chronicling the career of a man who many believe is the greatest interpreter of the country song who ever lived.  Jones had so many hits that some of them, such as his 1974 number one hit "The Door", and his chart topping duet "Golden Ring" with Tammy Wynette, could not be included.
 
In addition to Jennings and Wynette, the album includes appearances Melba Montgomery, Merle Haggard, Alan Jackson, the Oak Ridge Boys, Randy Travis, and Garth Brooks.

Track listing

Producers
Compilation producer: Evelyn Shriver
Associate producers: Susan Nadler and Michael Campbell
Art direction: Virginia Team and Luellyn Latocki
Design by Don Baily for Latocki Team Creative, Nashville, TN
Compilation engineered for release by Custom Mastering, Inc.

Chart performance

Certifications

References

2004 greatest hits albums
George Jones compilation albums